'Daşarx, Nakhchivan may refer to:

 Aşağı Daşarx
 Yuxarı Daşarx